Urdoma is the name of several inhabited localities in Russia.

Urban localities
Urdoma, Lensky District, Arkhangelsk Oblast, a work settlement in Lensky District of Arkhangelsk Oblast

Rural localities
Urdoma, Kozminsky Selsoviet, Lensky District, Arkhangelsk Oblast, a selo in Kozminsky Selsoviet of Lensky District of Arkhangelsk Oblast
Urdoma, Yaroslavl Oblast, a settlement in Pomogalovsky Rural Okrug of Tutayevsky District of Yaroslavl Oblast